The Senatus of Uganda is the highest governing Council of Legion of Mary  (Latin: Legio Mariae, postnominal abbreviation L.O.M.) in Uganda that reports to Concilium Legionis Mariae. Legion of Mary is a voluntary organisation whose membership are members of the Roman Catholic Church at the service of Our Lady, the Blessed Virgin Mary.

History 
Legion of Mary started on 7 September 1921. It mainly operated in Dublin Diocese due to mistrust developed because of its then-unusual dedication to lay apostolate until 1931 when Pope Pius XI praised the movement.  Venerable Edel Quinn volunteered as an envoy of Legion of Mary to East and Central Africa. She set sail for Africa from Tilbury in London (where she had been for extension work) on 30 October 1936. She arrived in Uganda on 22 July 1938.

On arrival, Edel Quinn met the then Henri Streicher, Vicar Apostolic of Northern Victoria Nyanza who accepted her to establish the Legion of Mary. She travelled to the mother house of the congregation of the Franciscan Sisters of Africa in Nkokonjeru in the current Lugazi Diocese where she established the first Praesidium in Uganda at Nkonkojeru PTC on 24 September 1938. The presidium was called "Our Lady of Mercy" because 24 September was the Feast of Our Lady of Mercy.

It should be remembered that 1939 was the beginning of World War II and it had an effect on consideration in English colonial countries and others like Tanganyika that had strong German connections. Edel continued her work regardless of the fuel rations among others.

She also visited other places in Kachumbala (Eastern Uganda), Christ the King Parish, Mulago, Nabbingo among others.

Growth 
The Praesidia started by Venerable Edel Quinn and some of the members she trained spread the Legion of Mary to different other places and started up Curia that later grew between 1956 and 1957 to Comitium that was established in Kampala. Uganda was under the Kampala Comitium until 20 May 1962 when Kampala was granted Senatus from Senatus of East Africa by Concilium. The inauguration was attended by among others Archbishop Joseph Kiwánuka. Prof. Dr. Raphael Owor was the first President of both the Comitium and the Senatus of Uganda. He was succeeded by Prof Charles Olweny as the 2nd President of Senatus of Uganda.

In the East (Tororo Archdiocese),  Mother Kevin (Rev. Sr. Kevin), the founder of the congregation of the Franciscan Sisters of Africa asked Teacher Mary Ester Nyakecho (RIP) to take Legion of Mary to Nagongera, St. Joan's Ssesera Girls primary school in 1946.

In the West (Mbarara Archdiocese), the nuns that were among the Legionaries that Edel Quinn had trained to help in the extension work travelled to Western Uganda in 1949. They started 4 Praesidia at Kitabi girls in Bushenyi District, Mbarara Primary Teachers' College in Mbarara District, Nyakibaale Primary Teachers' College in Rukungiri District and Ibanda Primary Teachers' College in Ibanda District.

The Senatus made efforts to extend Legion of Mary to the different parts of Uganda like areas of Mbarara, Soroti, among others.

Spiritual Directors 
The Spiritual Directors are the 1st officers of the Legion of Mary. Senatus of Uganda has had the following Spiritual Directors.

Structures 
Legion of Mary has its basic unit called a Praesidium, which is normally based in a sub parish. In case a sub parish does not have Legion of Mary, approach the Parish Priest and see how to start one. Praesidia hold a weekly meeting lasting at most one and a half hours in which they are assigned work to do in the course of the week. Two or more Praesidia in a city, town, or district form a Curia. In Uganda, most Curia are situated at the Parish. Different Curiae in an area may have one of them raised to form a Comitium. In Uganda, there are 25 Comitia that report directly to Senatus of Uganda.

Next to Comitia is the Regia, a title designated to a Council that exercises authority of Legion of Mary in a Large area. In Uganda, there are two Regie i.e. Regia of Western Uganda supervising Legion of Mary in Mbarara Archdiocese, Fort portal Diocese and Kasese Diocese and then Kabale Regia that supervises Legion of Mary in Kabale Diocese.

Senatus of Uganda holds its meetings once a month on the third Sunday of the month.

In Uganda, Legion of Mary has a total of approximately 400,000 members that include active Legionaries, Auxiliaries, Adjutorians and Praetorians

See also 
 Frank Duff
 Edel Quinn
 Alphonsus Lambe
 Catholic Church in Uganda

References

External links 
 Concilium Legionis Mariae
 Senatus of Uganda Website

Catholic organizations
1962 establishments in Uganda
Kampala
Kampala District
A